Austin John Murphy (born June 17, 1927) is a former American politician who served as a Democratic member of the U.S. House of Representatives from Pennsylvania from 1977 to 1995.

Born in North Charleroi, Pennsylvania, Murphy grew up in New London, Connecticut. He later returned to Charleroi and served in the United States Marine Corps from 1944 to 1946. He earned a B.A. at Duquesne University in 1949 and an LL.B. at the University of Pittsburgh in 1952 and was admitted to the Pennsylvania bar in 1953. He practiced law in Washington, Pennsylvania, and was an assistant district attorney for Washington County from 1956 to 1957. Murphy started his political career as a member of the Pennsylvania House of Representatives, where he served from 1959 to 1971. He then served in the Pennsylvania State Senate from 1971 to 1977. In 1976, he was elected to the United States House of Representatives, replacing longtime incumbent Thomas E. Morgan. He served as a delegate to the Democratic National Conventions in 1984 and 1988.

Scandals
Murphy was reprimanded by the 100th Congress in December 1987 for ghost voting and misusing House funds. He diverted government resources to his former law firm, had a ghost employee on his House payroll and had someone else cast votes for him in the House. The scandal ultimately led to his decision not to seek reelection in 1994.

In May, 1999, Murphy was indicted by a Fayette County grand jury of engaging in voter fraud. He was charged with forgery, conspiracy and tampering with public records. Murphy insisted that he was only trying to help elderly nursing home residents fill out paperwork that accompanied an absentee ballot. According to the grand jury, Murphy and two others forged absentee ballots for residents of the nursing home and then added Murphy's wife, Eileen Murphy, as a write-in candidate for township election judge. The next month, following closed-door negotiations, all but one of the voter fraud charges were dropped. Following the hearing, he left the building by a back door to avoid an angry crowd outside. He was sentenced to six months probation and fifty hours of community service.

See also

List of American federal politicians convicted of crimes
List of federal political scandals in the United States
List of United States representatives expelled, censured, or reprimanded

References

External links
 Retrieved on 2008-02-15
 

|-

|-

1927 births
American prosecutors
Censured or reprimanded members of the United States House of Representatives
Democratic Party members of the United States House of Representatives from Pennsylvania
Duquesne University alumni
Living people
Democratic Party members of the Pennsylvania House of Representatives
Military personnel from Pennsylvania
Pennsylvania lawyers
Democratic Party Pennsylvania state senators
Pennsylvania politicians convicted of crimes
Politicians from New London, Connecticut
United States Marine Corps personnel of World War II
United States Marines
University of Pittsburgh School of Law alumni